The Amazon Military Command ( or CMA) is one of eight Military Commands of the Brazilian Army. The Amazon Military Command is responsible for the defence of the Amazon Basin. Four Infantry Brigades specializing in Jungle warfare, one construction Engineer Brigade and one Military Regional Command are subordinated to the CMA. Its area of responsibility covers the states of Amazonas, Acre, Roraima and Rondônia.

Current Structure 

 Amazon Military Command (Comando Militar da Amazônia) in Manaus
 HQ Company Amazon Military Command (Companhia de Comando do Comando Militar da Amazônia) in Manaus
 1st Jungle Signals Battalion (1º Batalhão de Comunicações de Selva) in Manaus
 4th Army Aviation Battalion (4º Batalhão de Aviação do Exército) in Manaus
 7th Military Police Battalion (7º Batalhão de Polícia do Exército) in Manaus
 12th Jungle Anti-air Artillery Group (12º Grupo de Artilharia Antiaérea de Selva) in Manaus
 3rd Special Forces Company (3ª Companhia de Forças Especiais) in Manaus
 Jungle Warfare Instruction Center (Centro de Instrução de Guerra na Selva) in Manaus
 Military High School Manaus (Colégio Militar de Manaus) in Manaus 
 4th Geographic Center (4º Centro Geográfico) in Manaus
 12th Military Region (12ª Região Militar) in Manaus
 HQ Company 12th Military Region (Companhia de Comando da 12ª Região Militar) in Manaus
 12th Support Battalion (12º Batalhão de Suprimento) in Manaus
 12th Military Region Regional Maintenance Park (Parque Regional de Manutenção da 12ª Região Militar) in Manaus
 Amazon Military Command Boat Center (Centro de Embarcações do Comando Militar da Amazônia) in Manaus
 Manaus Military Area Hospital (Hospital Militar de Área de Manaus) in Manaus
 Tabatinga Garrison Hospital (Hospital da Guarnição de Tabatinga) in Tabatinga
 Porto Velho Garrison Hospital (Hospital da Guarnição de Porto Velho) in Porto Velho
 São Gabriel da Cachoeira Garrison Hospital (Hospital da Guarnição de São Gabriel da Cachoeira) in São Gabriel da Cachoeira
 29th Military Service Circumscription (29ª Circunscrição de Serviço Militar) in Manaus
 32st Military Service Circumscription (31ª Circunscrição de Serviço Militar) in Porto Velho
 1st Jungle Infantry Brigade (1ª Brigada de Infantaria de Selva) in Boa Vista
 HQ Company 1st Jungle Infantry Brigade (Companhia de Comando da 1ª Brigada de Infantaria de Selva) in Boa Vista
 1st Jungle Infantry Battalion (1º Batalhão de Infantaria de Selva) in Manaus
 "Roraima" Frontier Command/ 7th Jungle Infantry Battalion (Comando de Fronteira - Roraima e 7º Batalhão de Infantaria de Selva) in Boa Vista
 10th Jungle Field Artillery Group (10º Grupo de Artilharia de Campanha de Selva) in Boa Vista
 12th Mechanized Cavalry Squadron (12º Esquadrão de Cavalaria Mecanizado) in Boa Vista
 1st Jungle Signals Platoon (1º Pelotão de Comunicações de Selva) in Boa Vista
 32nd Military Police Platoon (32º Pelotão de Polícia do Exército) in Boa Vista
 1st Jungle Logistics Battalion (1º Batalhão Logístico de Selva) in Boa Vista
 Boa Vista Medical Post (Posto Médico de Boa Vista) in Boa Vista
 2nd Jungle Infantry Brigade (2ª Brigada de Infantaria de Selva) in São Gabriel da Cachoeira
 HQ Company 2nd Jungle Infantry Brigade (Companhia de Comando da 2ª Brigada de Infantaria de Selva) in São Gabriel da Cachoeira
 3rd Jungle Infantry Battalion (3º Batalhão de Infantaria de Selva) in Tefé
 "Rio Negro" Frontier Command/ 5th Jungle Infantry Battalion (Comando de Fronteira - Rio Negro e 5º Batalhão de Infantaria de Selva) in São Gabriel da Cachoeira
 22nd Jungle Signals Platoon (22º Pelotão de Comunicações de Selva) in Porto Velho
 22nd Military Police Platoon (22º Pelotão de Polícia do Exército) in São Gabriel da Cachoeira
 2nd Jungle Logistics Battalion (2º Batalhão Logístico de Selva) in São Gabriel da Cachoeira
 16th Jungle Infantry Brigade (16ª Brigada de Infantaria de Selva) in Tefé
 HQ Company 16th Jungle Infantry Brigade (Companhia de Comando da 16ª Brigada de Infantaria de Selva) in Tefé
 "Solimões" Frontier Command/ 8th Jungle Infantry Battalion (Comando de Fronteira - Solimões e 8º Batalhão de Infantaria de Selva) in Tabatinga
 17th Jungle Infantry Battalion (17º Batalhão de Infantaria de Selva) in Tefé
 16th Jungle Signals Platoon (16º Pelotão de Comunicações de Selva) in Tefé
 34th Military Police Platoon (34º Pelotão de Polícia do Exército) in Tefé
 16th Jungle Logistics Battalion (16º Batalhão Logístico de Selva) in Tefé
 17th Jungle Infantry Brigade (17ª Brigada de Infantaria de Selva) in Porto Velho
 HQ Company 17th Jungle Infantry Brigade (Companhia de Comando da 17ª Brigada de Infantaria de Selva) in Porto Velho
 "Acre" Frontier Command/ 4th Jungle Infantry Battalion (Comando de Fronteira - Acre e 4º Batalhão de Infantaria de Selva) in Rio Branco
 "Rondônia" Frontier Command/ 6th Jungle Infantry Battalion (Comando de Fronteira - Rondônia e 6º Batalhão de Infantaria de Selva) in Guajará-Mirim
 54th Jungle Infantry Battalion (54º Batalhão de Infantaria de Selva) in Humaitá
 61st Jungle Infantry Battalion (61º Batalhão de Infantaria de Selva) in Cruzeiro do Sul
 17th Jungle Infantry Company (17ª Companhia de Infantaria de Selva) in Porto Velho
 17th Jungle Signals Platoon (17º Pelotão de Comunicações de Selva) in Porto Velho
 17th Military Police Platoon (17º Pelotão de Polícia do Exército) in Porto Velho
 17th Jungle Logistics Battalion (17º Batalhão Logístico de Selva) in Porto Velho
 2nd Engineer Group (2º Grupamento de Engenharia) in Manaus
 HQ Company 2nd Engineer Group (Companhia de Comando do 2º Grupamento de Engenharia) in Manaus
 5th Construction Engineer Battalion (5º Batalhão de Engenharia de Construção) in Porto Velho 
 6th Construction Engineer Battalion (6º Batalhão de Engenharia de Construção) in Boa Vista
 7th Construction Engineer Battalion (7º Batalhão de Engenharia de Construção) in Rio Branco
 8th Construction Engineer Battalion (8º Batalhão de Engenharia de Construção) in Santarém
 21st Construction Engineer Company (21ª Companhia de Engenharia de Construção'') in São Gabriel da Cachoeira

References

Commands of the Brazilian Armed Forces
Regional commands of the Brazilian Army